Madison Speedway is a 3/8, black gumbo clay oval racetrack located in Madison, Minnesota. It is situated south of the town across the train tracks on State Highway 75 (Eighth Avenue).

Track information
The track currently runs on Saturday nights with WISSOTA sanctioning in five of their six divisions. The track also runs a local division of Pure Stocks.

Weekly program
Madison Speedway has a program complete with WISSOTA Modifieds, WISSOTA Midwest Modifieds, WISSOTA Super Stocks, and WISSOTA Street Stocks. Pure Stocks are also included in the Saturday night program.  Starting in 2012 Madison Speedway will be running their weekly shows on Saturday night.

References

External links
The Official Website of Madison Speedway

Tourist attractions in Lac qui Parle County, Minnesota
Buildings and structures in Lac qui Parle County, Minnesota
Motorsport venues in Minnesota